Verbascum chaixii, the nettle-leaved mullein, is a species of flowering plant in the genus Verbascum, native to Spain, France, Italy (including Sicily), the former Yugoslavia, and Greece. It is considered a good plant to attract pollinators. With Verbascum bombyciferum it is a parent of the 'Pink Domino' cultivar, which has gained the Royal Horticultural Society's Award of Garden Merit.

References

chaixii
Flora of Europe
Garden plants of Europe
Plants described in 1779